Certificate of Professional Competence (CPC) refers to two types of qualification in the UK transport and haulage industry:

Driver CPC, for professional bus, coach and lorry drivers
Transport Manager CPC, for transport managers